Demetrius Charles De Kavanagh Boulger (14 July 1853 – 15 December 1928) was a British author.

Biography 

He was born in Kensington to Brian Austin Boulger and Catherine de Kavanagh-Boulger. He was educated at the Kensington School. Beginning in 1876, Boulger contributed to the important British journals on questions concerning India, China, Egypt and Turkey and Congo. With Sir Lepel Griffin he founded in 1885 the Asiatic Quarterly Review and edited it during the first four and one-half years of its publication.

He died in St George's Hospital.

Works
 Lord William Bentinck. Rulers of India series.

References

Bibliography

External links

 
 

1853 births
1928 deaths
British historians
People educated at the Kensington School
People from Kensington